Rancho Murieta Airport  is a public-use airport located one mile (1.6 km) west of the central business district of Rancho Murieta, in Sacramento County, California, United States. It is privately owned by Rancho Murieta Airport Inc.

Although most U.S. airports use the same three-letter location identifier for the FAA and IATA, Rancho Murieta Airport is assigned RIU by the FAA but has no designation from the IATA.

Facilities and aircraft 

For the 12-month period ending December 31, 2002, the airport had 27,500 aircraft operations, an average of 75 per day: 96% general aviation and 4% air taxi. There are 64 aircraft based at this airport: 80% single engine, 8% multi-engine, 11% helicopters, and 2% ultralight.

References

External links 

Airports in Sacramento County, California
San Joaquin Valley